Wahpeton is a city in Dickinson County, Iowa, United States. The population was 345 at the time of the 2020 census.

Wahpeton is part of the Iowa Great Lakes region of northwestern Iowa, which is a regional vacation and recreation destination.

Geography
Wahpeton is located at  (43.371813, -95.173814).

Demographics

2010 census
As of the census of 2010, there were 341 people, 179 households, and 119 families residing in the city. The racial makeup of the city was 98.5% White, 0.6% African American, 0.3% Asian, and 0.6% from other races. Hispanic or Latino of any race were 0.3% of the population.

There were 179 households, of which 8.9% had children under the age of 18 living with them, 64.2% were married couples living together, 2.2% had a female householder with no husband present, and 33.5% were non-families. 29.6% of all households were made up of individuals, and 17.9% had someone living alone who was 65 years of age or older. The average household size was 1.91 and the average family size was 2.28.

The median age in the city was 63.1 years. 7.9% of residents were under the age of 18; 5.9% were between the ages of 18 and 24; 8.5% were from 25 to 44; 33.2% were from 45 to 64; and 44.6% were 65 years of age or older. The gender makeup of the city was 48.4% male and 51.6% female.

2000 census
As of the census of 2000, there were 462 people, 214 households, and 154 families residing in the city. The racial makeup of the city was 99.13% White, 0.43% Asian, 0.22% from other races, and 0.22% from two or more races. Hispanic or Latino of any race were 1.73% of the population.

There were 214 households, out of which 13.6% had children under the age of 18 living with them, 69.2% were married couples living together, 1.9% had a female householder with no husband present, and 28.0% were non-families. 23.8% of all households were made up of individuals, and 16.4% had someone living alone who was 65 years of age or older. The average household size was 2.12 and the average family size was 2.49.

In the city, the population was spread out, with 13.9% under the age of 18, 4.5% from 18 to 24, 13.9% from 25 to 44, 31.8% from 45 to 64, and 35.9% who were 65 years of age or older. The median age was 56 years. For every 100 females, there were 94.1 males. For every 100 females age 18 and over, there were 92.3 males.

The median income for a household in the city was $53,125, and the median income for a family was $62,083. Males had a median income of $41,500 versus $23,125 for females. The per capita income for the city was $36,258. About 4.4% of families and 7.3% of the population were below the poverty line, including 18.2% of those under age 18 and 2.1% of those age 65 or over.

Arts and culture
Gull Point State Park is located in the city, and the city is also the site of three religiously-based summer camps, Lakeshore Center at Okoboji (the Presbyterian Camp of Okoboji), Okoboji Lutheran Bible Camp and Camp Okoboji.

Education
The community is served by the Okoboji Community School District. The district was established on July 1, 1988, by the merger of the Arnolds Park and Milford school districts. Okoboji High School in Milford is the local high school.

References

External links
 City of Wahpeton, Iowa Website

Cities in Dickinson County, Iowa
Cities in Iowa
Dakota toponyms